The Very Best of Power Ballads - The Greatest Driving Anthems in the World... Ever! is an edition in The Greatest Driving Anthems in the World... Ever! series, which is a part of The Best... Album in the World...Ever! brand. Each album includes select power ballads starting from the 1960s, while one album specifically includes Sixties Power Ballads. This album was released November 7, 2005 and includes 50 rock love songs. The album was released with two different album covers.

Track listing

Disc 1
Queen - "We Are the Champions" (1977)
Foreigner - "I Want to Know What Love Is" (1985)
Phil Collins - "In the Air Tonight" (1981)
Whitesnake - "Is This Love" (1987)
Scorpions - "Wind of Change" (1990)
Joe Cocker & Jennifer Warnes - "Up Where We Belong" (1981)
Mr. Mister - "Broken Wings" (1985/1986)
Tina Turner - "We Don't Need Another Hero (Thunderdome)" (1986)
Cher - "If I Could Turn Back Time" (1989)
Cutting Crew - "(I Just) Died in Your Arms" (1986)
REO Speedwagon - "Can't Fight This Feeling" (1985)
Meat Loaf feat. Patti Russo - "I'd Lie For You (And That's The Truth)" (1983)
Heart - "Alone" (1987)
Alice Cooper - "Poison" (1989)
Marillion - "Kayleigh" (1986)
Starship - "Nothing's Gonna Stop Us Now" (1987)
Maria McKee - "Show Me Heaven" (1989)

Disc 2
Robbie Williams - "Angels" (1997)
The Cars - "Drive" (1985)
The Moody Blues - "Nights in White Satin" (1967/1972)
Air Supply - "All Out of Love" (1980)
Chicago - "Hard to Say I'm Sorry" (1982)
Roxette - "Listen to Your Heart" (1989)
Boston - "More Than a Feeling" (1976)
R.E.M. - "The One I Love" (1987)
Nickelback - "How You Remind Me" (2001)
The Rolling Stones - "Streets of Love" (2005)
The Animals - "The House of the Rising Sun" (1964)
Nilsson - "Without You" (1972/1976)
Sinéad O'Connor - "Nothing Compares 2 U" (1990)
Frankie Goes to Hollywood - "The Power of Love" (1984)
Poison - "Every Rose Has Its Thorn" (1989)
Nazareth - "Love Hurts" (1975)
Pandora's Box - "It's All Coming Back to Me Now" (1989)

Disc 3
Bonnie Tyler - "Holding Out for a Hero" (1984)
Europe - "The Final Countdown" (1987)
Whitesnake - "Here I Go Again" (1987)
Billy Idol - "White Wedding" (1982/1984)
Huey Lewis and the News - "The Power of Love" (1985)
Belinda Carlisle - "Leave a Light On" (1989)
Paul Carrack - "Don't Shed a Tear" (1986)
Alannah Myles - "Black Velvet" (1989)
4 Non Blondes - "What's Up" (1994)
Chad Kroeger feat. Josey Scott - "Hero" (2002)
T'Pau - "China in Your Hand" (1987)
Simple Minds - "Alive and Kicking" (1986)
Stevie Nicks - "Rooms On Fire" (1989)
John Waite - "Missing You" (1984)
Mike + The Mechanics - "Over My Shoulder" (1995)
Meat Loaf - "Bat Out of Hell" (1979)

References

 The Very Best of Power Ballads (front- and backcover)
 [ The Very Best of Power Ballads]
 The Very Best of Power Ballads (different album cover)

2005 compilation albums